Google Checkout was an online payment processing service provided by Google aimed at simplifying the process of paying for online purchases. It was discontinued on November 20, 2013 and the service moved to Google Wallet (now called Google Pay).

Users would store their credit or debit card and shipping information in their Google account, so that they could purchase at participating stores by clicking an on-screen button. Google Checkout provided fraud protection and a unified page for tracking purchases and their status.

History
Google Checkout service became available in the United States on June 28, 2006, and in the UK on April 13, 2007. It was free for merchants until February 1, 2008. From then until May 5, 2009 Google charged US merchants 2.0% plus $0.20 per transaction, and UK merchants 1.4% + £0.20. Google subsequently moved to a tiered cost structure, identical to that of PayPal. From that date, Google also discontinued its offer whereby merchants who advertised with an AdWords account were not charged fees on monthly transactions totaling less than ten times their monthly AdWords expenditure.

Google Checkout used to have a program allowing US IRS Certified 501(c)3 Non-Profit organizations to collect donations online without being charged the standard fee (2.9% + $0.30 per transaction under $3,000 monthly income, with lower rates for larger volumes).

In 2006, eBay, which owned PayPal at the time, added Google Checkout to its banned payment methods list, forbidding the use of Google Checkout to pay for eBay transactions. As of June 2011, eBay forbids the use of any external checkout system to pay for eBay transactions.

On November 20, 2013 it was discontinued.  The company offered a replacement solution for certain payments called Google Wallet.

Support
Google Checkout supported customers through multiple channels such as a Help Center, Help Forums, and email support. Google Checkout Buyers could find help at Google Checkout Buyer Help Center and Merchants could find help at Google Checkout Merchant Help Center and Google Checkout Merchant forum. This was subsequently only available for Google Grants recipients, and only through March 31, 2012.

See also
 Amazon Payments
 Electronic bill payment
 Electronic commerce
 Google Wallet
 List of on-line payment service providers
 Online banking
 PayPal
 Softcard (Isis Mobile Wallet)

References

External links
Google Checkout API
The Official Google Checkout Blog
Google Checkout's page on Facebook
Google launches payment service
Google unveils UK payments system

Payment systems
Checkout
Electronic funds transfer